Edward Thomas Giovanola (born March 4, 1969) is a former Major League Baseball infielder. He is an alumnus of Bellarmine College Preparatory and Santa Clara University.

Drafted by the Atlanta Braves in the 7th round of the 1990 MLB amateur draft, Giovanola spent several years with Atlanta's Double-A minor league affiliate, the Greenville Braves, before becoming a standout player with the Triple-A Richmond Braves, culminating in his Major League Baseball debut with the Atlanta Braves on September 10, 1995. After three years in Atlanta, Giovanola spent the following two years with the San Diego Padres, for whom he appeared in his final Major League game on August 25, 1999.

External links

Baseball players from California
1969 births
Living people
Atlanta Braves players
San Diego Padres players
Sumter Braves players
Las Vegas Stars (baseball) players
Richmond Braves players
Durham Bulls players
Idaho Falls Braves players
Greenville Braves players
Major League Baseball third basemen
Major League Baseball shortstops
Major League Baseball second basemen
People from Los Gatos, California
Anchorage Bucs players
Bellarmine College Preparatory alumni